Springfield Road station is a SEPTA Route 101 trolley stop in Springfield Township, Delaware County, Pennsylvania. It is located on Springfield Road between Windsor Circle and North Brookside Road, although SEPTA gives the address as being near Springfield and Rolling Roads.

Trolleys arriving at this station travel between 69th Street Terminal in Upper Darby, Pennsylvania and Orange Street in Media, Pennsylvania. The major SEPTA 101 line improvement project of 2008-2010 expanded, modernized, and refurbished this facility. Inbound (toward 69th Street Terminal) trolleys stop for passengers on the north side of Springfield Road at a platform equipped with a large shed with an overhanging roof. A second, smaller shelter was added to the inbound platform. Outbound trolleys stop along a new (2009) platform along the south side of Springfield Road, adjacent to the sizeable station parking lot. This long platform has two open-air metal benches and a bench in a small, roofed shelter to protect waiting passengers during inclement weather. The lighted, landscaped, free parking lot by this platform offers parking for approximately 30 vehicles, and includes spaces for handicapped drivers and a bicycle rack. Several additional free parking spaces for cars line the outbound tracks along North Rolling Road on the north side of Springfield Road across from Windsor Circle.

Station layout

External links

 Station from Springfield Road from Google Maps Street View

SEPTA Media–Sharon Hill Line stations